Yokogawa 1-chome is a Hiroden station on the Hiroden Yokogawa Line, located in Yokogawa-cho, Nishi-ku, Hiroshima. It is operated by the Hiroshima Electric Railway.

Routes
There are two routes that serve Yokogawa 1-chome Station:
 Yokogawa Station - Hiroden-honsha-mae Route
 Yokogawa Station - Eba Route

Station layout
The station consists of two side platforms serving two tracks. Access to the platforms is via a crosswalk.

Adjacent stations

Surrounding area
Hiroshima City Nishi Ward Library

History
Opened as "Koryuji-mae" on November 1, 1917.
Renamed to "Yokogawa 1-chome" in 1938.

See also

Hiroden Streetcar Lines and Routes

External links

Yokogawa 1-chome Station
Railway stations in Japan opened in 1917